The Saviour's Transfiguration Cathedral is the main Orthodox church of Dnipro, Ukraine.

History
The event is described in the memoirs of comte de Ségur. 

Prince Grigory Potemkin envisioned the church as one of the spiritual centres of New Russia. Ivan Starov submitted to Potemkin his designs for a Roman-style basilica, but construction was postponed until the end of the Russo-Turkish War.

In the early 19th century, Potemkin's plans were revived and updated by Duc de Richelieu, but construction did not start until 1830. The cathedral was built on a smaller scale than originally planned and was consecrated in 1835. The design is attributed to Andreyan Zakharov, chiefly on the ground of its similarity to Zakharov's cathedral in Kronstadt.

The church was closed to worshippers in 1930 and housed a museum of atheism between 1975 and 1988. The building was damaged by an earthquake in 1888 and by bombs during the Second World War.

References

External links
 3D-model Transfiguration Cathedral, Dnipro in the '3D Buildings' layer inside Google Earth

Eastern Orthodox cathedrals in Ukraine
19th-century Eastern Orthodox church buildings
Buildings and structures in Dnipro
Churches completed in 1835
Ukrainian Orthodox Church (Moscow Patriarchate) cathedrals
Tourist attractions in Dnipropetrovsk Oblast
Neoclassical church buildings in Ukraine